The Jardin botanique Nicolas Boulay is a botanical garden operated by the Faculty of Medicine at the Université Catholique de Lille, Lille, Nord, Nord-Pas-de-Calais, France.

The garden is named in honor of Abbé Jean-Nicolas Boulay (1837-1905), and is one of three botanical gardens in Lille, the others being the Jardin des Plantes de Lille and the Jardin botanique de la Faculté de Pharmacie at the Université de Lille 2.

See also 
 List of botanical gardens in France

References 
 Création d'un plan du jardin botanique Nicolas Boulay interactif
 Université Catholique de Lille presentation, slide 6
 Parcs et Jardins entry for Lille

Lille
Boulay, Jardin botanique Nicolas
Boulay, Jardin botanique Nicolas
Tourist attractions in Lille